The British Academy Television Award for Best International Programme, or BAFTA TV Award for Best International, is an award presented by the British Academy of Film and Television Arts, according to BAFTA the category is for "a single programme or series of any genre acquired from the international marketplace".

From 1964 to 1998 the category was awarded individually and not all years as Best Foreign Television Programme, after 1999 it started having a set of nominees and a winner under the name of Best International Programme.

Winners and nominees

1960s

1970s

1980s

1990s

2000s

2010s

2020s

Programmes with multiple wins and nominations

Multiple Awards

2 awards
Mad Men

Multiple Nominations

3 nominations
Mad Men
Succession

2 nominations
Borgen
Family Guy
The Handmaid's Tale
House of Cards
My Name is Earl
The Good Wife
The Killing
Transparent

References

International